Allamand is a  surname. It may refer to:

Andrés Allamand (Zavala) (born 1956), Chilean politician
Frédéric-Louis Allamand  (1736–after 1803), Swiss botanist
Ignacia Allamand (born 1981), Chilean actress
Jean-Nicolas-Sébastien Allamand (c. 1713-1716–1787), Swiss-Dutch natural philosopher
Jeanne-Charlotte Allamand (1760 – 1839), Swiss-born Canadian pioneer, educator and artist
Maité Allamand (1911–1996), Chilean writer and diplomat
Olivier Allamand  (born 1969), French Olympian freestyle skier